Mohammed Said Bareh was an Eritrean political figure. He was formerly the Administrator of Anseba Region and Minister of Foreign Affairs. He died in April 2008 and a state funeral was held for him attended by the president of Eritrea and high level officials who also were his former comrade-in-arms during the armed struggle. He is survived by his wife and three children.

References 

Year of birth missing
2008 deaths
People's Front for Democracy and Justice politicians
Government ministers of Eritrea
Eritrean People's Liberation Front members